Rhopalopilia is a genus of plants in the family Opiliaceae described as a genus in 1896.

Rhopalopilia is native to west-central Africa.

Species
 Rhopalopilia altescandens Mildbr. ex Sleum. - Cameroon, Central African Republic, Republic of the Congo, Democratic Republic of the Congo
 Rhopalopilia hallei Villiers - Gabon
 Rhopalopilia pallens Pierre - Gabon, Cameroon, Central African Republic, Republic of the Congo, Democratic Republic of the Congo

References

Opiliaceae
Santalales genera
Flora of West-Central Tropical Africa